The Miracle Worker is a 1962 American biographical film about Anne Sullivan, blind tutor to Helen Keller, directed by Arthur Penn. The screenplay by William Gibson is based on his 1959 play of the same title, which originated as a 1957 broadcast of the television anthology series Playhouse 90. Gibson's secondary source material was The Story of My Life, the 1903 autobiography of Helen Keller.

The film went on to be an instant critical success and a moderate commercial success. The film was nominated for five Academy Awards, including Best Director for Arthur Penn, and won two awards, Best Actress for Anne Bancroft and Best Supporting Actress for Patty Duke, the latter of whom, at age 16, became the youngest competitive Oscar winner at the time. The Miracle Worker also holds a 96% score from the movie critics site Rotten Tomatoes.

Synopsis
Young Helen Keller (Patty Duke), blind and deaf since infancy due to a severe case of scarlet fever, is frustrated by her inability to communicate and subject to frequent violent and uncontrollable outbursts. Unable to deal with her, her terrified and helpless parents contact the Perkins School for the Blind for assistance. In response, they send Anne Sullivan (Anne Bancroft), a former student, to the Keller home as a tutor. A battle of wills ensues as Anne breaks down Helen's walls of silence and darkness through persistence, love, and sheer stubbornness, starting by teaching Helen to make a connection between her hand signs and the objects in Helen's world for which they stand.

Cast
 Anne Bancroft as Anne Sullivan
 Patty Duke as Helen Keller
 Victor Jory as Captain Arthur Keller
 Inga Swenson as Kate Keller
 Andrew Prine as James Keller
 Kathleen Comegys as Aunt Ev
 Beah Richards as Viney (uncredited)
 Jack Hollander as Mr. Anagnos (uncredited)
 Michael Darden as Percy (uncredited)
 Dale Ellen Bethea as Martha (uncredited)
 John Bliss as Admissions Officer (uncredited)
 Judith Lowry as 1st Crone (uncredited)
 William F. Haddock as 2nd Crone (uncredited)
 Helen Ludlam as 3rd Crone (uncredited)
 Michelle Rees as Mercy (Maranatha Baptist University play)

Production notes

Despite Anne Bancroft's award-winning performance as Anne Sullivan in the Broadway production, United Artists executives wanted Elizabeth Taylor to be cast in this role in the film adaptation. However Arthur Penn (who had also directed the stage production) insisted on using Bancroft. As a result, the studio viewed the film as a risky prospect and granted Penn only a tight budget of $1,300,000 (of which $200,000 was spent in purchasing the rights to the play).

In addition, despite the fact that Patty Duke had played Helen Keller in the play, she almost did not get the part. The reason was that at 15 she was too old to portray a seven-year-old girl, but after Bancroft had been cast as Anne, Duke was chosen to play Helen in the film.

For the dining room battle scene, in which Anne tries to teach Helen proper table manners, both Bancroft and Duke wore padding beneath their costumes to prevent serious bruising during the intense physical skirmish. The nine-minute sequence required three cameras and took five days to film.

The film was shot at Big Sky Ranch in Simi Valley, California, and Middletown, New Jersey.

It was remade for television in 1979 with Patty Duke as Anne and Melissa Gilbert as Helen as well as in 2000 with Alison Elliott and Hallie Kate Eisenberg in the lead roles.

The film ranked 15 on AFI's 100 Years...100 Cheers: America's Most Inspiring Movies.

Reception
In his review in The New York Times, Bosley Crowther wrote: The absolutely tremendous and unforgettable display of physically powerful acting that Anne Bancroft and Patty Duke put on in William Gibson's stage play The Miracle Worker is repeated by them in the film ... But because the physical encounters between the two ... seem to be more frequent and prolonged than they were in the play and are shown in close-ups, which dump the passion and violence right into your lap, the sheer rough-and-tumble of the drama becomes more dominant than it was on the stage ... The bruising encounters between the two ... are intensely significant of the drama and do excite strong emotional response. But the very intensity of them and the fact that it is hard to see the difference between the violent struggle to force the child to obey ... and the violent struggle to make her comprehend words makes for sameness in these encounters and eventually an exhausting monotony. This is the disadvantage of so much energy. However, Miss Bancroft's performance does bring to life and reveal a wondrous woman with great humor and compassion as well as athletic skill. And little Miss Duke, in those moments when she frantically pantomimes her bewilderment and desperate groping, is both gruesome and pitiable.

TV Guide rates the film 4 out of a possible five stars and calls it "a harrowing, painfully honest, sometimes violent journey, astonishingly acted and rendered".

Time Out London wrote: It's a stunningly impressive piece of work ... deriving much of its power from the performances. Patty Duke and Anne Bancroft spark off each other with a violence and emotional honesty rarely seen in the cinema, lighting up each other's loneliness, vulnerability, and plain fear. What is in fact astonishing is the way that, while constructing a piece of very carefully directed and intelligently written melodrama, Penn manages to avoid sentimentality or even undue optimism about the value of Helen's education, and the way he achieves such a feeling of raw spontaneity in the acting.

Awards and honors

Other honors
The film is recognized by American Film Institute in these lists:
 2003: AFI's 100 Years...100 Heroes & Villains:
 Annie Sullivan – Nominated Hero
 2005: AFI's 100 Years of Film Scores – Nominated
 2006: AFI's 100 Years...100 Cheers – #15

See also
 List of American films of 1962
 The Miracle Worker (1979 film)
 The Miracle Worker (2000 film)
 Black (2005 film)
 List of films featuring the deaf and hard of hearing

References

External links
 
 
 
 

1962 films
1962
1960s biographical drama films
American biographical drama films
American black-and-white films
Films about blind people
Films about deaf people
Films about educators
American films based on plays
Helen Keller
Films featuring a Best Actress Academy Award-winning performance
Films featuring a Best Supporting Actress Academy Award-winning performance
United Artists films
Films directed by Arthur Penn
Films scored by Laurence Rosenthal
1962 drama films
Photoplay Awards film of the year winners
1960s English-language films
1960s American films
Films about disability